Messan Ametekodo (born 3 December 1974) is a retired Togolese football defender. He was a squad member for the 1998 and 2000 Africa Cup of Nations.

References

1974 births
Living people
Togolese footballers
Togo international footballers
AS Mangasport players
Dynamic Togolais players
Association football defenders
Togolese expatriate footballers
Expatriate footballers in Gabon
Togolese expatriate sportspeople in Gabon
21st-century Togolese people